Victor Berco (born 20 April 1979) is a Moldovan former footballer.

Football career
In July, 2002, he arrived Russia and signed a contract with Shinnik Yaroslavl of Premier League.

In April, 2004 he joined FC Oryol of First Division.

He then spent two seasons with Kazakhstani side Almaty before back to Russia for First Division newcomer Volga Ulyanovsk.

International career
He played the last official match for Moldova on 6 September 2006, a UEFA Euro 2008 qualifying, which he was sent off after being booked for a second time. In the whole Euro 2008 qualifying campaign, he played the first two games. He also the member of 2002 FIFA World Cup qualifying, and UEFA Euro 2004 qualifying. Berco has made 16 appearances for the national team.

References

External links

FIFA.com

1979 births
Living people
Sportspeople from Bălți
Moldovan footballers
Moldova international footballers
Association football forwards
FC Shinnik Yaroslavl players
SK Sturm Graz players
Russian Premier League players
Expatriate footballers in Kazakhstan
Moldovan expatriate sportspeople in Kazakhstan
Expatriate footballers in Austria
Moldovan expatriate sportspeople in Austria
Expatriate footballers in Russia
Moldovan expatriates in Russia
FC Zimbru Chișinău players
CSF Bălți players
FC Oryol players
Moldovan Super Liga players
FC Volga Ulyanovsk players